Robert Plutchik (21 October 1927 – 29 April 2006) was a professor emeritus at the Albert Einstein College of Medicine and adjunct professor at the University of South Florida. He received his Ph.D. from Columbia University and he was also a psychologist. He authored or coauthored more than 260 articles, 45 chapters and eight books and edited seven books. His research interests included the study of emotions, the study of suicide and violence, and the study of the psychotherapy process.

Theory of emotion
Plutchik proposed a psychoevolutionary classification approach for general emotional responses. He considered there to be eight primary emotions—anger, fear, sadness, disgust, surprise, anticipation, trust, and joy. Plutchik argues for the primacy of these emotions by showing each to be the trigger of behaviour with high survival value, such as the way fear inspires the fight-or-flight response.

Plutchik's psychoevolutionary theory of basic emotions has ten postulates.
 The concept of emotion is applicable to all evolutionary levels and applies to all animals including humans.
 Emotions have an evolutionary history and have evolved various forms of expression in different species.
 Emotions served an adaptive role in helping organisms deal with key survival issues posed by the environment.
 Despite different forms of expression of emotions in different species, there are certain common elements, or prototype patterns, that can be identified.
 There is a small number of basic, primary, or prototype emotions.
 All other emotions are mixed or derivative states; that is, they occur as combinations, mixtures, or compounds of the primary emotions.
 Primary emotions are hypothetical constructs or idealized states whose properties and characteristics can only be inferred from various kinds of evidence.
 Primary emotions can be conceptualized in terms of pairs of polar opposites.
 All emotions vary in their degree of similarity to one another.
 Each emotion can exist in varying degrees of intensity or levels of arousal.

Plutchik's wheel of emotions 

Plutchik also created a wheel of emotions to illustrate different emotions. Plutchik first proposed his cone-shaped model (3D) or the wheel model (2D) in 1980 to describe how emotions were related.

He suggested 8 primary bipolar emotions: joy versus sadness; anger versus fear; trust versus disgust; and surprise versus anticipation. Additionally, his circumplex model makes connections between the idea of an emotion circle and a color wheel. Like colors, primary emotions can be expressed at different intensities and can mix with one another to form different emotions.

The theory was extended to provide the basis for an explanation for psychological defence mechanisms; Plutchik proposed that eight defense mechanisms were manifestations of the eight core emotions.

Publications
Plutchik contributed the "Emotions" article to the encyclopedia, World Book Millennium 2000.

Notes

References

External links
 The Nature of Emotions, a model that describes the relations among emotion concepts. Plutchik's Theory of Emotions
 The Nature of Emotions (American Scientist Vol. 89, No. 4 (July–August  2001), pp. 344–350)

20th-century American psychologists
Emotion psychologists
1927 births
2006 deaths
Columbia University alumni
University of South Florida faculty
Yeshiva University faculty